Sima Sami Bahous (born 26 June 1956) is a Jordanian diplomat and women’s rights advocate, currently serving as Executive Director of UN Women. She has previously served as Permanent Representative of Jordan to the United Nations since August 2016 until assuming her present role as head of UN Women in September 2021.

Early life and education
Bahous was born in June 1956. She has a bachelor's degree in English literature from the University of Jordan, a master's degree in literature and drama from the University of Essex and a PhD in communications and development from Indiana University. Her dissertation was entitled "Communication Policy and Planning for Development: The Jordan Television Corporation: A Case Study (1988)."

Career
Bahous was head of communications at UNICEF in Amman from 1994 to 1995 and a development advisor at the World Health Organization in Sanaa from 1996 to 1997. She returned to Jordan in 1997 to serve as Executive Director of the King Hussein and Noor Al Hussein Foundations until 2001, before becoming head of media and information at the Royal Hashemite Court and an advisor to King Abdullah.

Bahous also served as head of the Higher Media Council in Jordan from 2005 to 2008. From 2008 to 2012 she was Assistant Secretary General at the Arab League in Cairo. 

From 2012, Bahous served as Assistant Secretary-General for the United Nations Development Programme and Administrator and Director of the UNDP's Regional Bureau for Arab states. In August 2016, she was appointed as Jordan's Permanent Ambassador to the United Nations in New York, replacing Dina Kawar who was appointed as Jordan's ambassador to the United States.

Publications

Personal life
Bahous is married to Ziad Rifai and has one daughter, Jahan.

References

 Living people
 1956 births
University of Jordan alumni
Alumni of the University of Essex
Indiana University alumni
Permanent Representatives of Jordan to the United Nations
Jordanian women ambassadors
Jordanian women diplomats